Neurolipa is a genus of moths in the family Gracillariidae.

Species
Neurolipa randiella  (Busck, 1900)

External links
Global Taxonomic Database of Gracillariidae (Lepidoptera)

Gracillariinae
Gracillarioidea genera